Hethersett is a large village and electoral ward in the county of Norfolk, England, about  south-west of Norwich. In 2013 Hethersett became the first village or town in the United Kingdom to receive a Prime Minister's Big Society Award for its outstanding contribution to the Olympic legacy and sport and fitness in general.

History 

The Parish of Hethersett is, by Norfolk standards, a large one, covering 2,695 acres; it was the main settlement in the ancient Hundred of Humbleyard; it lies in the Deanery of Humbleyard and in the South Norfolk district.

Hethersett stretched three miles from east to west along the line of the B1172 (the old Norwich to London road) and two miles from northwest to southeast. The road cuts it into slightly larger northern and smaller southern divisions; the Norwich to Cambridge railway follows its southern boundary but otherwise the parish has no obvious physical limits and presumably represents the land needed to feed the Saxon settlements that grew up in the area.

Residential developments to the North of the village, toward little Melton has given rise to the discovery of a Roman settlement, possibly including a Roman Villa. Residential development to the north west of the village had been put on hold as a result of the discovery of this Roman find. Trial excavations in late 2020 established that further investigations are needed.

From the west, moving in a clockwise direction, the parishes contiguous with this are those of Wymondham, Great Melton, Little Melton, Colney, Cringleford, Intwood (now part of Keswick) and Ketteringham.

The meaning of the name of Hethersett is not clear; the guide to the church suggests the enclosure for the deer: 'heedra' is an Old English word for heather or heath, and 'set' is Old English for a dwelling place, camp, stable or fold. This would give the meaning as being that of a camp or enclosure on the heath.

Although the name is Saxon, we have evidence of earlier settlers; a New Stone Age long barrow (burial mound) lies in Cantley and two areas of Roman pottery have been found in the northern part of the parish; in view of the existence of a great Roman centre at Caistor St Edmund, the latter finds are nor surprising.

The earliest description of Hethersett comes to us in the Domesday Book account of 1086; it would seem that there were perhaps 400 people in the parish by that time. The Lord of the Manor had 87 sheep and seven hives of bees, perhaps gathering nectar from the heather, among his possessions.

The Domesday Book also mentions the church with its 60 acres of land, a handsome endowment: no Saxon or Norman work remains to be seen because of later rebuilding. There is also mention of a second church and this presumably applies to the church of Cantley, then a separate parish, of which nothing now remains except some mounds in a pasture to the north of Cantley Farm. This small parish was amalgamated with its larger neighbour in 1397 although the church was used as a chapel until the 16th century.

During medieval times, the parish seems to have had an uneventful history. The present parish church was begun in 1320 and the tower and nave arcades and windows are in the decorated style (1290–1330). It is dedicated to St Remigius (438–533), the great Bishop of Rheims. Remigius de Hethersete, a priest who also participated in the building of Hingham Church, may have suggested the dedication in honour of his name-saint. The clerestory of the nave and the lovely north porch were added in the 15th century.

The Domesday village had become three manors or at least was part of three manors by the 13th century. These became known as Hethersett Cromwells, Hethersett Hacons and Hethersett Woodhall. Cromwells was the chief manor and its manor house was probably in the meadows immediately to the south of Church Farm. Hacons and Woodhall sites are less certain and the lands of these manors lay in the neighbouring parishes as well as Hethersett. Thickthorn seems to have had a separate hamlet with its own moated house near to the present Hall.

As the community grew during the 16th century, the commons became especially important to those who had little other land. Hethersett with its open green, Lynch Green, would have had cottages and farm buildings around the edge. Lynch Green opened out westwards to the great common where Wymondham, Great Melton and Hethersett parishes met. The most famous event in Hethersett's history took place in 1549 when Robert Kett and his men tore down John Flowerdew's hedges on Hethersett common. Kett's Oak is said to commemorate the spot where rebels gathered before marching to Mousehold Heath in Norwich.

In the 17th and 18th centuries, several fine houses were built or added to in the village. Access was improved by the turnpiking of the main road in the middle of the 17th century. Farmhouses of some style were built at Hill Farm, Whitehouse Farm, Cedar Grange and Beech Grove as yeomen bought up land and some of the common fields disappeared.

Woodhall, the Priory and the Old Hall were modernised and extended by Norwich merchants such as John Buckle, Mayor of Norwich in 1793, who lived in the Priory.

In the early 19th century, Hethersett Hall was built and its attractive park and ornamental lake laid out by the Back family. The Hill House estate was laid out in the 1780s by a Mr Brown. Perhaps the greatest change of all came as a result of the enclosure award of 1799 when Lynch Green was divided up and disappeared as an open space, although the tithe map shows that there were still only a few houses along Mill Road and Great Melton Road in 1844.

In Victorian Miniature, Owen Chadwick gives us a detailed account of life in the area in the middle of the 19th century. The Rev William Waite Andrew, the Vicar of Ketteringham and one of the two central characters in the book, lived at Woodhall which he bought for £3,600 in 1841, and to which he added a new western extension.

In the 19th century, village crafts and small industries employed a number of men locally; two windmills existed, one giving the name to Mill Road. Three smithies existed in the village in the 1880s and carriages were built at Harveys. There was a brickyard in Queen's Road. The railway lasted 120 years; it arrived as the Norwich & Brandon Railway in 1846, but was closed to passengers in 1966.

Hethersett lies so close to Norwich that many think of it as just another of its suburbs. It is, however, a separate community with its own vitality and quite a marked community spirit. This shows itself in a range of activities in the village but also in more permanent ways in items provided for the village through the efforts of villagers. These include a learner swimming pool in the Middle School, a bench in the memory of Zita James sited at the church, a cassette library, the conversion of School House in the Middle School to provide a Music Room, the erection of a village sign, village street plans, the Jubilee Youth Club and the Scout and Guide Hut. Trees have been planted in various parts of the village and a memorial plaque has been erected on the site of the old School (No 3 Queen's Road). The Parish Council have provided litter bins, salt and grit bins for use in icy weather and "Fido" bins.
The village has a football team, Hethersett Athletic, that caters for boys and girls football from around 5 years old to men’s and women’s football teams.

In September 1994 the new village hall was opened in Back Lane, funded mostly by Wilcon Homes under a Section 106 Planning Gain agreement. The hall has a purpose built stage with seating for 250 and provides a committee room for 50 people.

In 1801 Hethersett had a population of 696 (in 90 houses), by 1851 this number had nearly doubled, but it never reached this total again until 1931; since then and especially in the last 20 years or so, Hethersett's population has risen to over 5,000. It is now as large as some of Norfolk's market towns. During the past seven years the Steepletower site near the parish church has expanded rapidly; by 1995 about 360 dwellings had been completed out of a projected figure of 520.

Water supply, mains drains, a new surface water drainage system, street lights, branch library, new first school and high school, reflect the demands of a rapidly growing population for improved services. The village has its own post office, surgery, pharmacy and dentist and the square in Great Melton Road (known to locals as Oak Square) has is the centre of the shopping works fir the village. Here you can find a national chain supermarket, two independent take away food outlets, the post office, a hairdressers, an independent gift shop and an estate agent.

Other shops on the same road consist of two charity shops, a butchers and a chemist.

One other independent shop selling food, alcohol and newspapers is adjacent to the recreation field on Recreation Road.

The village has two pubs, the Queens Head and the Kings Head . The village also has a social club that is home to a bowls club and has a clubhouse bar and function room.

In 2020 Norfolk Police bought the former Old Hall School and this will become a police training centre, for Norfolk police and other constabularies around the UK.

The construction of the A11 dual carriageway from Cringleford to Wymondham initially reduced the traffic using the old A11 (now B1172), but with the growth of nearby Wymondham in terms of residential development along the Norwich Road corridor since 2018, the amount of traffic using the B1172 continues to increase.

The effects of the opening of the Norwich Southern Bypass are less direct, but already land nearby has come under pressure for development. Hethersett's situation so close to Norwich with its excellent facilities and transport links means pressures for growth and development (both desirable and undesirable) will continue in the foreseeable future.

Despite the substantial growth of housing over the last 40 years, the Parish of Hethersett still has much wildlife interest. The built up area covers less than 25% of this large parish, leaving a considerable acreage of arable land and open spaces.

Two areas of much interest are the Kissing and Suckling Lanes, both public footpaths. From the former the walker has excellent views of the park with its remaining large trees and lake. Members of the thrush family regularly feed here; sometimes in early spring these include large gatherings of fieldfares and redwings before they depart for their eastern breeding grounds. Both Canada and Barnacle geese breed in the vicinity of the lake where mallards, moorhens and coots are regularly seen. Commorants also visit these waters with a variety of other ducks dropping in from time to time. The careful observer can often see a patient heron or even a kingfisher waiting for a catch.

There are many interesting walks in the parish including footpaths to the Village Pit and from New Road to Great Melton church. They contain old hedges and mature trees providing suitable homes for various birds. Hethersett continues to grow but it remains a village with much natural beauty for those with the eyes and ears willing to seek it.

Places of worship

St Remigius Parish Church 
Hethersett had a church at the time of the Domesday Book of 1086. How long before is unknown. There is nothing visible of the early building. Today's church dates from the 14th century with 15th-century additions. It is built of flints and local field stones with Caen stone dressings and the roof is of lead and slate.

The tower, built in four stages, supports a lead-dressed steeple which is topped by a weathervane depicting a dove perched upon a coiled serpent and holding in its beak, love-lies-bleeding. Chequered flushwork of dressed stone and flints around the plinth and buttress facings contrast with the field stones and small patches of brickwork of the tower walls. There are niches at the lower levels and a 14th-century west window with decorated tracery.

A clock faces the road, and below the battlements, on each face, are 14th-century two-light openings. Small quatrefoil openings provide daylight to the tower stairs ascending in the southwest corner. A medieval door to the stairs gives access to eight bells cast between 1607 and 1904.

An attractive 15th-century porch on the north side is built with broken flints embellished with flushwork. It is entered through a perpendicular arch flanked by side shafts with salamander capitals and angels carved within spandrels.

Inside, the ribs of a fine vaulted ceiling supporting the priest room above spring from carved corbels. The nave, enhanced in the 15th century and restored in 1858 has two roof lines and a shallow clerestory. Both aisles have matching windows.

The north side is buttressed with dressed stone and flint while at the south, red brick replaces earlier work.

Around 1535, following the Dissolution of the Monasteries, the chancel fell into disrepair. Rebuilding took place in 1897 and at the same time transepts were formed by extending the aisles eastwards. Field stones and flint facings salvaged from the foundations of the nearby ruined hall were used in the rebuild. Diagonal buttresses support the corners. The east window dates from the 14th century. Gable crosses adorn the chancel and nave.

Inside, floral decoration and texts are painted above the arches of the arcades, tower and chancel. An early 13th-century styled piscina with a marble colonette is in the chancel and another, with a trefoil head of 14th-century origins, in the Lady Chapel.

The octagonal font with traceried bowl now stands at the west end of the north aisle. The beautifully painted panels of the reredos depicting saints was the work of Sister Myra of All Hallows' Convent, Ditchingham.

In 1858, the stonework was restored and the church refitted with open benches, oak pulpit, etc., at a cost of £1,200, raised by subscription. Henry Back, J. H. Gurney and the rector were the largest contributors, the former also restoring the belfry, recasting one bell, and the latter, restoring the south porch and the two altar tombs.

Mr Back gave the organ in 1874. There are several memorials inside the church, one of the most striking being that of John Luke Iselin in the form of a black ledger stone of marble in the central aisle of the nave. He was a native of Basel in Switzerland, who came to this country in the 1770s and applied for naturalisation in 1772 after making a success as partner of a wool stapling business.

The earliest headstones are to be found at the west end of the churchyard. There is one to Mary, daughter of John and Mary Bowles, 1708, to Abigail Howes, 1779, and to Sarah, the wife of Robert Harpley, 1791.

The churchyard today is a tranquil place but in the early years of the 19th century, when body snatchers were active in acquiring bodies for anatomical dissection, there is a report that on 2 February 1825, "A body of an old man, buried in Hethersett churchyard was stolen by resurrection men. A similar outrage took place in Thorpe churchyard on the same date." An interesting connection to this incident was the fact that on 21 January 1829, there was a doctors' meeting at the Guildhall about difficulties in pursuing anatomical studies, and that the legislature was to be petitioned.

The weathervane is quite unusual, and an explanation was given in the Sunday Companion of July 1922. The living was in the gift of Caius College, Cambridge, and the design embodies the crest worn by Dr Caius, who founded Gonville College, later, Gonville and Caius, in the late 16th century.

The dove is represented holding in its beak what was the styled flower gentle, otherwise Amaranthus, love-lies-bleeding, a symbol of immortality. It was early in the 18th century that Dr John Gostlin, the patron of the living, gave the patronage to the Master and Fellows of the College.

John Berney was rector of Hethersett, 1736–82, and also rector of Saxlingham Nethergate and Saxlingham, and Archdeacon of Norwich. In the tithe book for 1737–69, it is recorded that Dr Berney "the liberal benefactor to this living has forborn to add the expenses of the new stable", presumably at the rectory, "the spire of the church, and many expenses in the gardens and yards".

There were three 19th-century rectors, Bartholomew Edwards, Jeremy Day, to whom the oak pulpit was dedicated, and William Reynolds Collett. Collett (1855–1903), was very interested in the history of St Remigius and Hethersett parish, and there are many entries in the parish magazines written by him.

In August 1874, the rector stated that the earliest parish register was from 1616. He estimated the population of Hethersett, then, as about 500. In 1875, he gave his view on the changes in Hethersett church in the turbulent years resulting from Queen Mary Tudor's accession in 1553.

At that time, the rector of the previous five years, Christopher Wilson, was obliged to resign and his place was taken by Edward Jackson, a more compliant man who adopted the usages of the Church of Rome and who then, on Elizabeth I's accession, adopted the requirements of the law. He remained rector until 1573.

In September 1880, Collett's notes give some idea of the situation in Hethersett in the late 17th century.

"After the Restoration of Charles II in 1660, property here as elsewhere changed hands. Thus the manors of Hethersett, which had been settled on Thomas Flowerdew of London, merchant, after having been mortgaged to William Gostlin, were sold in 1678 to Captain John Aide of Horstead. The advowson had since 1639, been in the hands of the Gostlin family, and in 1670, Caius College, Cambridge, presented Mr. Thomas Church to the Rectory. Some indication of the character of the man.... May be inferred from an entry in Register Book No. 2... '1671 I came hither to reside in May, during the vacation of the living, and the time before the residence the burials and the christenings were unknown to me'."

"The churchwardens at the generall at Windham were required to give a note of them, and promised to doe it." Then follow some imperfect records of burials, and this note in the same hand: "Mem. I have required the parishioners to finde a clerke that might bee able to write the names of such as are to bee registered. And also required by myself and the present clerke or sexton that such as are concerned should give me the names of ther children and friends deceased and borne, that they might bee better registered. But as yet cannot see any effect. Thomas Church." (The spelling is transcribed exactly)

"On Tuesday 26 March,...1895... the Parish council met again and received ... a report that they had inspected the Documents now belonging to the council, and kept in the Church Vestry, and received an acknowledgement signed by the Rector and Churchwardens, that they have in the Iron Chest:	

 Hethersett Award and Map (in a wooden box), dated 1800
 Assessment or Valuation of the Parish 1834
 Survey 1834
 The list of the population 1801; and there are besides in the Vestry, Assessment Books from 1815 to 1834. These, according to the arrangement made on Feb.5th are to remain where they are open, of course, to inspection at reasonable hours like the documents belonging to the Rector and Churchwardens which are kept in the same place."

And in October 1899, "An effort is being made to obtain lectures by various speakers on subjects of general interest on some of the coming moonlit evenings." This is a reminder that winter events had to be planned around the phases of the moon.

Canon John Still followed the Rev. Collett as rector, 1903–14. During the late 19th century he had been a missionary at the time when cannibals were still active in Melanesia, now the Solomon Islands. He became rector in 1903 and died on 19 August 1914 during the 8.30am service whilst preaching in front of the pulpit. The place of his collapse is marked with a marble inlay.

The Back family were generous benefactors of the church. In 1860, two pieces of land were sold to the church. Later, three pieces of land to extend the churchyard, were given, the first on 2 March 1888 on the south side, reserving part as a family burial site, on 29 October 1920, a strip on the east side, and in 1943, land between the present B1172 and the sunken roadway.

A vestry meeting held in June 1897 resolved to form a committee to plan the rebuilding of the chancel of St. Remigius. However, it appears that this was a continuation of proposals formulated about 1877 as the new committee had already had sums of £1,753.10s.0d paid or promised, and architects' plans of 1877 and 1881 were available. The 1881 plan furnished by the late A. E. Browne, provided for the addition of an organ chamber at the end of the south aisle and a vestry on the north side.

The parish magazine of July 1897 goes on to state that "the east window will be restored to its original position, and beneath it, as now, will fit into the present reredos erected in 1866." There was an estimate of £2,000, which, the writer says, will be forthcoming freely. (The final account was to be £2,600.)

The rebuilding of the chancel began on 12 July 1897, the first step being the removal of the east window and much of the east wall. The foundations of the old chancel were apparently firm and good and the new walls were raised on them. In clearing these foundations at the east end, workmen found and replaced in situ the sills of two small windows which gave light to a chamber below the high altar. The then rector said that the new walls were to be two feet three inches in thickness, about eighteen inches of which being nine inches Peterborough brick, with a nine-inch outer facing of flintwork.

He also reported that about 35 years previously, when windows were removed, signs of a Norman chisel were revealed, and that a few years previously, (presumably previous to the date at which he was writing, November 1897), traces of a Norman doorway were discovered in the north porch. This would have been some 300 years before the present building was erected by Sir William Bernack and confirms the documentary evidence found in the Domesday Book.

The parish magazine of November 1897 states that the best of the flints used to rebuild the chancel were taken from the foundations of an old hall which many years previously became deserted and allowed to fall into decay. It was known as "Mockbeggar Hall" because its ancient reputation of helping the poor had been lost.

Apparently, the hall had once been owned by a wealthy man but eventually was occupied by the squatters of the time and thus needy travellers were disappointed at finding no succour, hence the unusual name. The site of this important building seems to have been on the left side of a footpath leading from the southeast corner of the churchyard over a bridge to the lane from the high road to the railway station.

The rebuilt chancel was opened and dedicated on St Peter's Day, 29 June 1898 to the memory of Mrs Mary Collett, the rector's wife who had died in December 1896. The sermon was preached by the Bishop of Travencore, an Indian diocese.

The service commenced with the singing of Psalm 24 and after prayers, a Te Deum was sung. The alms collected were not for the chancel just rebuilt, but for a fund for the restoration of the roof of the original nave, which, as the rector states, "was altered by the greedy man, (Flowerdew), who threw down the chancel just rebuilt, and who did even worse by destroying the beautiful choir at the east end of Wymondham Church. The monks were not faultless, but they were not so base as that selfish destroyer of Churches."

The final ceremony took place on Sunday 3 July, when the chancel was decorated by flowers which were then distributed to many mission rooms in London.

In 1937, the clock on the north side of the tower was placed to commemorate the Coronation of King George VI and Queen Elizabeth. Recently, since 1990, kitchen and toilet facilities have been installed. Other work under consideration includes a glazed screen behind the pews which will support a balcony and floor giving access to other rooms above.

Hethersett Methodists 
As early as 1792, there were Wesleyan Methodists in Hethersett. The Society was one of 17 which formed the Diss Circuit. At first there was no chapel and, complying with the conditions of the 1689 Toleration Act, the house of Robert Baley (probably in Mill Road) was licensed as a preaching place.

On 1 October 1817, a Wesleyan chapel was licensed, erected it is said by a Methodist builder who rented it to the Society for £8 a year. It was what is now called the Schoolroom but without the extensions.

The Tithe Map of 1846 describes it as a Meeting House. The Hethersett Society had now been transferred to the Norwich Circuit.

In the years following the death of John Wesley there were various secessions from the Wesleyan Methodist Church; the most notable were the Methodist New Connexion (1797), the Primitive Methodists (1810) and the Bible Christians (1815). Others made attempts for reform from within, particularly the Wesleyan Methodist Association (1835) and the Wesleyan Reformers (1849). These two came together in 1857 to form the United Methodist Free Churches. In 1858 the Calvert Street Circuit, including Hethersett, separated from the Wesleyans and joined this body. Some objected to too much power being in the hands of the ministers and the denying of responsibility to lay people. Others sought to combine the independence of the congregational system with the supportive role of connexionalism.

There are notes about village Societies that had failed to pay their dues; on one occasion representatives were appointed to visit Hethersett and Weston to "improve the organisation."

Since services had to be sustained in the villages by an itinerant ministry and local preachers, the local Society Steward was a person of some influence and importance. In Hethersett he paid the rent, kept the key and was said to have power to admit and exclude from the building whom he would.

Robert Richardson was Steward from 1872 to 1909. In 1880 he allowed a temperance lecturer to use the building. To the objectors he said: "I pay the rent and I hold the key, and the teetotaller can have his meeting. Them that don't like it will have to lump it."

George Bunn, a Methodist ploughman who came to live in the village, preached twice a quarter and conducted a weekly class meeting. In 1910 William Wade a local coach builder became Society Steward. He helped to form the first Chapel Trust. It owned the organ, the pulpit Bible and the lamps. It also purchased some land in the corner of Queen's Road and Lynch Green, for it was feared that the rented site on which the chapel stood might be lost when the land was auctioned on the death of its owner. In fact, it proved to be an unnecessary precaution.

On 7 July 1920, the site including chapel with pitch-pine pews, gallery, platform and pulpit together with four cottages was purchased by the Methodists for £250. The notice of sale described it as a Wesleyan chapel. In fact, there had been no return to the Mother Church. In 1907 three break away connections had come together as the United Methodist Church. Together with the Primitives and the Wesleyans they were to amalgamate in 1932 to form the Methodist Church of Great Britain.

The previous chapel, which now forms the basis of the extended building of the 1980s, was built in 1922 at a cost of £1,814. The pulpit was made of native oak by C. W. Wiles and John Harvey and the wrought iron gates by C. L. Smith. The 50th anniversary services were held on 28 and 29 October 1972 and in February the following year there were other events to mark the completion and rededication of the Schoolroom rebuilding. This included storage facilities and a kitchen with classrooms above.

In 1981 numbers of worshippers were increasing and it was felt that the church needed some sort of extension. "Operation New Look" - the fund-raising venture - with grants from bodies in Methodism, and other gifts, raised £123,000 to finance the project.
The church as it is at present (1989) has been turned from north/south to east/west by removing the east wall and building on an extension to the worship area, a General Purposes Room (which can be added into the worship area), toilets, two entrance areas and a vestry. The old vestry and toilet area at the north end was included in the worship area.

A balcony was created and the organ from the Chapel at Keswick Hall was brought in. The old pulpit was used to create a smaller pulpit and the lectern. The new apse on the west side forms the back of the sanctuary area and the communion rail and the communion table of oak were crafted by Edmund (Teddy) Forster of G. W. Gooch and Sons of Norwich who were the contractors for the alterations.

The pitch-pine pews were removed and chairs are now used in varying formations. The re-opening of the extended and modernised premises took place in October 1983. The premises provide not only for the Methodists of the village but for other groups too.
Gradually as the population of the village grew there was disquiet regarding the space available. The space had seemed so adequate in 1922 but its shoe box shape with narrow central aisle from narrow door to pulpit and organ, prohibited expansion at the entrance and circulation and cloakroom space were quite inadequate.

Matters came to a head in 1970. Even before that date a detailed survey of the premises had made it clear that about £800 a year for the next five years would have to be spent to avoid deterioration. The result of further discussions showed that a radical solution was necessary.
On 1 April 1980 Kenneth James, a local architect, presented a report to a special meeting of the church council. Even minor modifications and improvements would cost £6,000. A more revolutionary scheme, involving enlargement to a capacity of 175, meant adding length and breadth to the existing church. This, it was said, would cost about £45,000. The meeting gave general approval, but referred the matter to the property committee for further discussion.
On 4 November the council approved a more detailed scheme. One side of the church would be extended into the car park, giving more circulation and cloakroom space and an extra meeting room. On the wall opposite would be the communion table, flanked by a pulpit and reading desk made from the existing large pulpit. The congregation would be seated in a semi-circle facing the table.

A small gallery was to be provided for the organ. Later an anonymous donor was to present a fine instrument, made available on the closure of Keswick College of Education. Additional gifts of a wooden cross behind the table and an enlargement of the window looking out to the road added to the beauty of the building. As the work began, the amount of the appeal had to be raised to £70,000.

Work started towards the end of 1982. On Saturday 19 March 1983 the stone laying took place. Stones were laid by Mr David Richardson in memory of his parents, who, over the years, had done so much for the church and by Mr Herbert Thrower and Miss Sian Evans to represent the older and younger members of the congregation.

The formal re-opening and dedication took place on Saturday 22 October 1983. This was performed by Mr Paul Bartlett Lang, Vice-President of the Methodist Conference. Others taking part were the Chairman of the East Anglian District, the Superintendent of the Norwich Circuit, two members of the congregation and of the minister, the Rev Brian Dann.

By this time the cost had risen to £126,000. It took four years to reach that target. Grants were obtained from charitable trusts such as the Joseph Rank Benevolent Trust. There were donations from the circuit and some of its churches. There was a loan from the Chapel Aid Department and also interest free loans from members and friends. Events were organised by the "New Look" Committee and individual and group efforts such as dinners, coffee mornings, sales of work (under various names) were just some of the ingenious means of raising money.

Education
Hethersett has several schools. Hethersett Academy (formerly Hethersett High School) and two Primary schools. Hethersett VC Primary School located in the former Hethersett Junior School (formerly Hethersett Middle School) located on Queens Road, with Hethersett Woodside Primary & Nursery School having a new school built in 2019. The school was opened in 2021 for 420 students and is located on Coachmaker Way.

The village used to be home to Hethersett Old Hall School, an independent school located on Norwich Road. It was a day school for girls aged 4–18 and for boys aged 4–11 and boarding school for girls aged 9–18. The school closed in 2019.

Sport in Hethersett 
Hethersett was named Active Norfolk Sports Village of the Year and Sports Champion of Champions in 2011. The village was awarded a London 2012 Olympics Inspire Award for outstanding contribution in support of the games.

A Hethersett and the Meltons Sports Association was set up in 2011 to oversee sport, fitness and well being in the villages of Hethersett, Little Melton and Great Melton. It meets quarterly.

There are sports clubs in the villages of Hethersett and the Meltons including:

Hethersett Athletic Football Club which has National Football Association Community Charter Mark status
Hethersett Hawks Cycle Speedway Club which has been in existence for over 50 yeard
Hethersett and Tas Valley Cricket Club which goes back to the 19th century and holds the nationally recognised clubmark
Hethersett Queen's Road Badminton Club
Hethersett Netball Club
Hethersett Junior Netball Club 
Crusaders Rugby Club
Little Melton Cricket Club
Hethersett Social Club Bowls
Hethersett Playing Field Bowls Club
Hethersett Petanque Club

2012 Olympics
Hethersett was noted as having held more Olympic-themed events per capita than any other village, town or city in the United Kingdom. As a result of this, despite being bypassed by the torch route, the Olympic flame paid a special off-route visit to the village on Thursday 5 July before the Olympic Torch left Norwich. The Flame arrived at Hethersett High School at about 6.21am.

Awards 

Hethersett was named Eastern Daily Press Pride in Norfolk Community of the Year for 2012 for villages and towns with populations over 5,000. The judges praised the village for its outstanding community spirit and can do attitude. The village won the same award in 2006. There was also praise at an award ceremony at Norfolk County Council for the village web site. In 2013 Hethersett became the first village or town in the United Kingdom to receive a Prime Minister's Big Society award.

Hethersett has won a number of awards in the past 10 years. These include:
 South Norfolk Village Games Winners 2011 and 2012
 Norfolk Village Games Runners-Up 2011 and 2012
 Eastern Daily Press/Active Norfolk Sports Village of the Year 2011
 Eastern Daily Press/Active Norfolk Sports Champion of Champions 2011
 Run England Eastern Region Club of the Year 2012 (Hethersett Social Running Club)
 Prime Minister's Big Society Award 2013

A number of local residents have won individual awards including: Mel Perkins (MBE for services to sport). Dr Anne Edwards (BEM for services to Science), Duncan Pigg (BEM for services to the village) and Peter Steward (South Norfolk Diamond Jubilee award for Inspiring Achievement). In 2012 Parish Councillor and Chairman of Hethersett Olympic Committee Shane Hull and organiser of the Hethersett Ducklings Playgroup Nicky Wardale were selected to run with the Olympic Torch in the lead up to the 2012 London Games. Village stalwart Duncan Pigg was awarded the British Empire Medal (BEM) in the 2013 New Year's Honours to mark over 60 years of service to Hethersett.

Transport

The main road through the village was turnpiked in the middle of the 17th century.  Three blacksmiths existed in the village in the 1880s and carriages were built at Harveys.

The village was formerly served by Hethersett railway station, but this was closed in 1966.  Regular bus services operate between the village, Wymondham and Norwich.  The village is also close to the Thickthorn Park and Ride.

Businesses

Hethersett is home to a few small businesses , mainly service based, that benefit from easy access to Norwich city centre. Two of the largest businesses in Hethersett are the Park Farm Hotel and television advertising production company the JMS Group.

Hethersett has shops - Tesco Express - Premier - Boots - Hethersett Butchers. To complement these there are two charity shops, two hairdressers, a coffee shop and the village cafe, the latter on Mill Road. There is a farm shop on New Road , a further butchers at Church Farm as well as a food shop and Church Farm Garage.

A Petroleum Storage Depot was built at Hethersett during World War Two for receiving fuel by rail and supplying RAF bases by road.  It was connected to the Government Pipeline and Storage System in 1943/4.  In 1980 a diesel pump-house was constructed and a pipeline built connecting it to RAF Coltishall. The depot had four 500-ton tanks, two 1,000-ton tanks and two 2,000-ton tanks. It was mothballed and emptied of fuel in the 2000s following the closure of RAF Coltishall, and later sold.

References

External links

Hethersett website

 
Villages in Norfolk
Civil parishes in Norfolk